Liu Gang is a Chinese former Olympic boxer. He represented his country in the flyweight division at the 1992 Summer Olympics. He lost his first bout against Héctor Ávila.

, Liu is a boxing promoter. His family members are Hai Sheng (son), Annie (daughter), and Xin (wife).

References

https://www.sixthtone.com/news/1009852/the-godfather-of-chinese-boxing#:~:text=Few%20people%20have%20heard%20of,the%20world's%20most%20populous%20nation.

1972 births
Living people
Chinese male boxers
Olympic boxers of China
Boxers at the 1992 Summer Olympics
Flyweight boxers